This article displays the qualifying draw of the 2011 SAP Open.

Players

Seeds

  Robert Farah (qualified)
  Alex Kuznetsov (qualified)
  Jesse Levine (qualified)
  Nicholas Monroe (first round)
  Artem Sitak (second round)
  Roman Borvanov (qualified)
  Pierre-Ludovic Duclos (qualifying competition)
  Luka Gregorc (qualifying competition)

Qualifiers

  Robert Farah
  Alex Kuznetsov
  Jesse Levine
  Roman Borvanov

Qualifying draw

First qualifier

Second qualifier

Third qualifier

Fourth qualifier

References
 Qualifying Draw

2011 - qualifying
SAP Open - qualifying
2011 SAP Open